The 2014 BC Lions season was the 57th season for the team in the Canadian Football League and their 61st overall. The Lions qualified for the playoffs for the 18th straight year. However, the team lost the East Semi-Final to the Montreal Alouettes by a score of 50–17.

Offseason

Free agents

CFL draft
The 2014 CFL Draft took place on May 13, 2014. The Lions had seven selections in the draft, losing their first round selection after they traded for Kevin Glenn. They also had another second round selection following last season's trade with Edmonton for Mike Reilly.

Preseason

 Games played with colour uniforms.

Regular season

Standings

Schedule

 Games played with colour uniforms.
 Games played with white uniforms.
 Games played with alternate uniforms.

Post-season
The Lions clinched their 18th straight playoff berth with a week 18 win over the Winnipeg Blue Bombers. Their final position in the standings, however, wasn't decided until the final game of the regular season when the Saskatchewan Roughriders clinched third place with a win over the Edmonton Eskimos, keeping the Lions in fourth place. Qualifying with the crossover rule, the Lions played in the CFL East Division playoffs for the fourth time in franchise history and the most of any western club in CFL history.

Schedule

 Games played with white uniforms.

Team

Roster

Coaching staff

References

BC Lions seasons
2014 Canadian Football League season by team
2014 in British Columbia